The Labour and Welfare Bureau is an executive agency of the Government of Hong Kong responsible for employment, labor-development, manpower, human resources management, poverty-reduction, and social welfare in Hong Kong.

The bureau is managed by the Secretary for Labour and Welfare.

Subordinate departments
The following public entities are managed by the bureau:

Labour Department
Social Welfare Department

See also
Hong Kong Disciplined Services

References

External links
 

2007 establishments in Hong Kong
Government agencies established in 2007
Hong Kong government policy bureaux
Hong Kong
Hong Kong